To be distinguished from a later composer Azzolino Bernardino della Ciaia (1671-1755)

Alessandro Della Ciaia (c. 1605-c. 1670) was an Italian nobleman and amateur composer.

He obtained texts to his madrigals through membership of literary academies in Siena.

Works
 Madrigali Op. 1 Venice (1636)
 Lamentatione sagre Op. 2 (1650)
 Sacri modulatus. Op. 3 inc. Lamentatio virginis, (1666)

Selected discography
 Lamentatio virginis, 1666 on Love and Lament Netherlands Bach Society Jos van Veldhoven, Channel Classics CCS 17098
 Lamentationi Sagre op.2, 1650, Roberta Invernizzi & Laboratorio '600, Glossa Music, GCD 922903

References

Italian Baroque composers
1600s births
1670s deaths
Italian male classical composers
17th-century Italian composers
17th-century male musicians